The tiny tyrant-manakin or tiny tyranneutes (Tyranneutes virescens) is a species of bird in the family Pipridae. It is found in Brazil, French Guiana, Guyana, Suriname, and Venezuela. Its natural habitat is subtropical or tropical moist lowland forest.

References

Further reading
 Snow, D.W. (1961). "The displays of the manakins Pipra pipra and Tyranneutes virescens." Ibis 103A(1):110-113

tiny tyrant-manakin
Birds of the Guianas
Birds of the Amazon Basin
tiny tyrant-manakin
Taxonomy articles created by Polbot